The 1990 Oceania Athletics Championships were held at the National Stadium in Suva, Fiji, between July 11–14, 1990.

A total of 38 events were contested, 22 by men and 16 by women.

Athletes from the French overseas territories in the South Pacific were only admitted as guests.

Medal summary
Medal winners were published.

Men

†: The 110 m hurdles event was won by Albert Chambonnier

Women

Medal table (unofficial)

References

Oceania Athletics Championships
Oceanian Championships
1990 in Fijian sport
International athletics competitions hosted by Fiji
July 1990 sports events in Oceania